Good Luck Jerry is a 2022 Indian Hindi-language black comedy crime film directed by debutant Sidharth Sengupta, written by Pankaj Matta and produced by Subaskaran Allirajah, Aanand L. Rai and Mahaveer Jain . A remake of the 2018 Tamil film Kolamaavu Kokila written and directed by Nelson Dilipkumar, it stars Janhvi Kapoor as the titular lead alongside Deepak Dobriyal, Mita Vashisht, Neeraj Sood, Saurabh Sachdeva, Sushant Singh and debutant Samta Sudiksha in pivotal roles. The film premiered on 29 July 2022 on Disney+ Hotstar.

Plot

Jaya "Jerry" Kumari, a young Bihari girl, lives with her mother, Sharbati, and little sister, Chhaya "Cherry" Kumari, in a small town in Punjab. She works in a massage parlour as an adult. Their unmarried neighbour, Anil, who secretly harbours feelings for Sharbati, is always supportive towards them and acts as a father figure to both Jerry and Cherry. Sharbati is unhappy about Jerry's job, though she is determined to continue the job as she can earn more money there and can live a comfortable life. Rinku, a local derp, stalks Jerry even though she is uninterested in him. Tenzin is Jerry friend and help in her mother business.

One day, Sharbati gets ill and is diagnosed with stage two lung cancer and 25 lakh rupees is needed for her medical treatment and chemotherapy. One day, jerry accidently help police nab a drug smuggler. Inspector Lal thanks her for catching him. The smuggler's boss, Timmy, and his henchmen, Mohinder "Daddu" Singh Chandal and Jigar, confront Jerry outside the market. Timmy tells Jerry to bring the hidden stash of drug from inside the market. With Cherry being taken hostage by Jigar, a frightened Jerry manages to retrieve the drugs amidst police security. While returning home, Jerry discovers that Cherry has stolen the smuggler wallet and money. She thinks overnight and decides to smuggle drugs to earn more money for her mother's treatment.

Over the next day, Jerry locates Timmy's place and asks him to consider her for the job as she badly needs money. Timmy at first hesitates but ultimately agrees to keep her as he is infatuated with her. He also convinces his boss Daler to give Jerry the job. He directs her to supply the drugs to a fish factory owned by Ram Malik by hiding it within noodles in a tiffin box. Quickly enough, she becomes an expert and begins to earn more than the men, using the money to treat Sharbati who she has told that her boss sanctioned a loan. One day, Jerry sees Inspector Lal in the massage parlour and suffers a nervous fit, but it turns out that he is the owner's husband. Meanwhile, one of Timmy's henchmen snitches Jerry out to Inspector Lal. Consequently, a police officer searches Jerry on the bus she has boarded and finds drugs in the tiffin box but dismisses it, as he is later revealed to work for Timmy, who discovers the traitor's identity using one of his other men's, but kills both on Jerry's request. Shaken and traumatized, she tells Timmy about not wishing to continue and asks him to pay her dues. Timmy tells her to come the next day. When Jerry goes there to settle the dues, an enraged Timmy says she is very selfish and asks her to give him a body massage. When he tries to take advantage on Jerry, she pushes him away and escapes, leaving him paralyzed.

Jerry returns home to elope with her family but finds Daddu, Jigar and the rest of Timmy's henchmen already holding Sharbati and Cherry captive. Daddu calls Daler, who informs Jerry that she is good to earn her freedom back in exchange for a grand delivery worth 100 kilograms of cocaine. Jerry agrees to do so and hatches a plan with her family and Anil. As part of the plan, Sharbati fakes illness the next day and Jerry and Cherry pretend to ask for help. However, just when the plan seems to work fine with Jigar and a henchman driving the minivan into the area, Rinku intercepts the gang and offers to help Jerry. Eventually, they pick up Sharbati along with the bed, and get her on the minivan. On the way, Rinku learns that they are smuggling drugs which are actually hidden beneath the bed, causing him to lose his composure. They somehow escape a police check, faking Sharbati's illness, and arrive at the fish factory to deliver the drugs and leave. However, Daler soon learns that only 10% of the consignment was actual cocaine, and the rest was salt. Aware of the realization that she and her family, along with Anil and Rinku, would be killed at the end of the consignment delivery, Jerry reveals to Daler that she is safe as long as they can't figure out the location of the rest of the drugs. Malik catches Jerry and her family along with Anil and Rinku yet again and Jerry discloses another location, though it soon turns out that instead of salt, it was just refined sugar. 

While being tortured for their bluff by Malik's man, Jerry and the others, shortly after killing their captor, bump into Inspector Lal and seek his help for caputuring the gang in exchange for her freedom. They convene at Timmy's restaurant, where Daler and his men take everyone hostage, with enraged Daler hitting Jerry everywhere. Jerry's friend Tenzin and his gang reach there with the drugs, but yet again, it turns out to be fine flour; in the meantime, Inspector Lal and his team fight back. After a shootout, all the gang members except an injured Timmy are shot dead. The police seizes the place and Jerry is about to return home, but is interjected by Inspector Lal who demands that she come with him to the police station. Jerry reminds him of their deal but he rebuffs her. Out of options, Jerry tells him that he would never know the real location of the drugs in the event of an arrest, which, as it turns out, is revealed to be his own house, where an almirah due for movement was stashed with the drugs. Helpless, he allows Jerry to walk free, after which she is seen leaving the place with her family and Anil, reciting the fact that, to survive in this world, all one needs is a little bravery.

Cast 
 Janhvi Kapoor as Jaya "Jerry" Kumari 
 Samta Sudiksha as Chhaya "Cherry" Kumari 
 Deepak Dobriyal as Rinku Khanna
 Mita Vashisht as Sharbati Kumari
Atikur Rahman Mahi
 Neeraj Sood as Anil Mehra
 Sushant Singh as Daler
 Sahil Mehta as Jigar
 Saurabh Sachdeva as Ram Malik
 Sandeep Nayak as Jagdish
 Shubham Raj as Drug peddler
 Jaswant Singh Dalal as Timmy
 Mohan Kamboj as Mahinder Singh Chandal a.k.a. Daddu
 Tashi Kalden as Tenzin

Production 
Principal photography commenced on 11 January 2021 in Punjab. The film was wrapped up on 20 March 2021.

Soundtrack 

Distributed and released by Zee Music Company, the songs of Good Luck Jerry is composed entirely by Parag Chhabra in his first solo venture, with lyrics by Raj Shekhar. Aman Pant composed the background score.

Reception 
Dishya Sharma of News 18 rated the film 3.5 out of 5 stars and wrote "Good Luck Jerry is chaotic and fun, bringing back memories of simple comedies such as Hungama and Tanu Weds Manu. I did wish this was a theatrical release". Dhaval Roy of The Times of India rated the film 3.5 out of 5 stars and wrote "Good Luck Jerry is a hilarious and entertaining fare that would have been perfect if it were a tad shorter". Rohit Bhatnagar of The Free Press Journal rated the film 3.5 out of 5 stars and wrote "Good Luck Jerry is the perfect weekend binge with a runtime of 119 minutes. Watch it for Janhvi's performance and dark humour". Shubham Kulkarni of Koimoi rated the film 3.5 out of 5 stars and wrote "Janhvi Kapoor is proving herself film after film. I hope she only gets better at her craft. The film as a whole is a fun watch and has its own amazing moments". A critic for Bollywood Hungama rated the film 3 out of 5 stars and wrote "GOOD LUCK JERRY rests on a wellwritten script, strong performances and good humour". A critic for Pinkvilla rated the film 3 out of 5 stars and wrote "Good Luck Jerry is an entertaining ride despite some hiccups in the narrative. It's a film made for the OTT, and this section of the audience should embrace the dark comedy space with open arms. Shubhra Gupta of The Indian Express rated the film 2.5 out of 5 stars and wrote "Despite a few slack patches, this Janhvi Kapoor-starrer never loses sight of the fact that it needs to be a caper". Saibal Chatterjee of NDTV rated the film 2.5 out of 5 stars and wrote "The film benefits from the effort that Janhvi puts and the support that she gets from the rest of the cast, made up mostly of actors who definitely deserve to be busy and popular".

References

External links 
 

Films shot in Punjab, India
Hindi remakes of Tamil films
Indian black comedy films
Indian crime comedy films
2022 black comedy films